Dolenje Sušice is a small settlement in the Municipality of Dolenjske Toplice in Slovenia. It lies on the right bank of the Sušica River south of Dolenjske Toplice. The area is part of the historical region of Lower Carniola. The municipality is now included in the Southeast Slovenia Statistical Region.

References

External links
Dolenje Sušice on Geopedia

Populated places in the Municipality of Dolenjske Toplice